Class H: Social Sciences is a classification used by the Library of Congress Classification system. This article outlines the subclasses of Class H.

H - Social sciences (General) 

1-99.......Social Sciences (General)

HA - Statistics 

1-4737.......Statistics
29-32.......Theory and method of social science statistics
36-37.......Statistical services. Statistical bureaus
38-39.......Registration of vital events. Vital records
154-4737.......Statistical data
154-155.......Universal statistics
175-473.......By region or country

HB - Economic theory; Demography 

1-3840.............Economic theory. Demography
71-74.............Economics as a science. Relation to other subjects
75-130............History of economics. History of economic theory (Including special economic schools)
131-147...........Methodology
135-147..........Mathematical economics. Quantitative methods (Including econometrics, input-output analysis, game theory)
201-206...........Value. Utility
221-236...........Price
238-251...........Competition. Production. Wealth
501...............Capital. Capitalism
522-715...........Income. Factor shares
535-551..........Interest
601..............Profit
615-715..........Entrepreneurship. Risk and uncertainty. Property
801-843...........Consumption. Demand
846-846.8.........Welfare theory
848-3697..........Demography. Population. Vital events
3711-3840.........Business cycles. Economic fluctuations

HC - Economic history and conditions 

10-1085.......Economic history and conditions
79...........Special topics (Including air pollution, automation, consumer demand, famines, flow of funds, etc.)
92...........Economic geography of the oceans (General)
94-1085......By region or country

HD - Industries; Land use; Labor 

28-9999...........Industries. Land use. Labor
28-70............Management. Industrial management
39-40.7.........Capital. Capital investments
41..............Competition
45-45.2.........Technological innovations. Automation
47-47.4.........Costs
49-49.5.........Crisis management. Emergency management. Inflation
50-50.5.........Delegation of authority. Decentralization. Span of control
56-57.5.........Industrial productivity
58..............Location of industry
58.7-58.95......Organizational behavior, change and effectiveness. Corporate culture
59-59.6.........Public relations. Industrial publicity
60-60.5.........Social responsibility of business
61..............Risk in industry. Risk management
62..............Standardization. Simplification. Waste
62.2-62.8.......Management of special enterprises
66-66.2.........Work groups. Team work in industry. Quality circles
69..............Other (Including business consultants, capacity, size of industries, etc.)
72-88............Economic growth, development, planning
101-1395.5.......Land use. Land tenure
1286-1289.......Communal ownership
1290-1291.......Municipal ownership
1301-1313.......Nationalization (Agrarian socialism)
1326-1329.......Large holdings
1330-1331.......Landlord and peasant
1332-1333.5.....Land reform. Agrarian reform
1334-1335.......Consolidation of land holdings
1336-1339.......Small holdings. Peasant proprietors. Parcellation
1361-1395.5.....Real estate business
1401-2210........Agriculture
1428-1431.......International cooperation
1470-1476.......Size of farms
1478............Sharecropping
1483-1486.......Agricultural associations, societies, etc.
1491-1491.5....Cooperative agriculture
1492-1492.5.....Collective farms
1493-1493.5.....Government owned and operated farms. State farms. Sovkhozes
1501-1542.......Agricultural classes (Including farm tenancy, agricultural laborers)
1549............Gleaning
1580............Reclamation of agricultural land. Melioration
1635-1702.......Utilization and culture of special classes of lands (Including pasture lands, water resources development)
1711-1741.......Irrigation
2321-4730.9......Industry
2329............Industrialization
2330............Rural industries
2331-2336.......Home labor. Home-based businesses
2337-2339.......Sweatshops
2340.8-2346.5...Small and medium-sized businesses, artisans, handicrafts, trades
2350.8-2356.....Large industry. Factory system. Big business
2365-2385.......Contracting. Letting of contracts
2421-2429.......Trade associations
2709-2930.7.....Corporations (Including international business enterprises, diversification, industrial concentration, public utilities)
2951-3575.......Cooperation. Cooperative societies
3611-4730.9.....Industrial policy. The state and industrial organization (Including licensing of occupations and professions, subsidies, inspection, government ownership, municipal services)
4801-8943........Labor. Work. Working class
4861-4895.......Labor systems
4909-5100.9.....Wages
5106-5267.......Hours of labor (Including overtime, shift work, sick leave, vacations)
5306-5474.......Labor disputes. Strikes and lockouts
5481-5630.7.....Industrial arbitration. Mediation and conciliation
5650-5660.......Employee participation in management. Employee ownership. Industrial democracy. Works councils
5701-6000.9.....Labor market. Labor supply. Labor demand (Including unemployment, manpower policy, occupational training, employment agencies)
6050-6305.......Classes of labor (Including women, children, students, middle-aged and older persons, minorities)
6350-6940.7.....Trade unions. Labor unions. Workers' associations
6941-6948.......Employers' associations
6951-6957.......Industrial sociology. Social conditions of labor
6958.5-6976.....Industrial relations
6977-7080.......Cost and standard of living
7088-7252.......Social insurance. Social security. Pension
7255-7256.......Vocational rehabilitation. Employment of people with disabilities
7260-7780.8.....Industrial hygiene. Industrial welfare
7795-8027.......Labor policy. Labor and the state
8031............Labor in politics. Political activity of the working class
8038............Professions (General). Professional employees
8039............By industry or trade
8045-8943.......By region or country
9000-9999........Special industries and trades
9000-9495.......Agricultural industries
9502-9502.5.....Energy industries. Energy policy. Fuel trade
9506-9624.......Mineral industries. Metal trade
9650-9663.......Chemical industries
9665-9675.......Pharmaceutical industry
9680-9714.......Mechanical industries (Including electric utilities, electronic industries, and machinery)
9715-9717.5.....Construction industry
9720-9975.......Manufacturing industries
9999............Miscellaneous industries and trades

HE - Transportation and communications 

1-9990............Transportation and communications
199-199.5........Freight (General)
199.9............Passenger traffic (General)
305-311..........Urban transportation
323-328..........Transportation geography. Trade routes
331-380..........Traffic engineering. Roads and highways. Streets
369-373.........Traffic surveys (General)
374-377.........Bridges
379-380.........Tunnels. Vehicular tunnels
380.8-971........Water transportation
380.8-560.......Waterways
561-971.........Shipping
730-943........Merchant marine. Ocean shipping. Coastwise shipping
1001-5600........Railroads. Rapid transit systems
5601-5725........Automotive transportation (Including trucking, bus lines, and taxicab service)
5746-5749........Stage lines
5751-5870........Ferries
5880-5990........Express service
6000-7500........Postal service. Stamps. Philately
7511-7549........Pneumatic service
7601-8700.95.....Telecommunication industry. Telegraph
8660-8688.......Wireless telegraph. Radiotelegraphy
8689-8700.95....Radio and television broadcasting
8701-9680.7......Telephone industry
9713-9715........Cellular telephone services industry. Wireless telephone industry
9719-9721........Artificial satellite telecommunications
9723-9737........Signaling
9751-9756........Messenger service
9761-9900........Air transportation. Airlines

HF - Commerce 

1-6182...............Commerce
294-343.............Boards of trade. Chambers of commerce. Merchants' associations
1014................Balance of trade
1021-1027...........Commercial geography. Economic geography
1040-1054...........Commodities. Commercial products
1701-2701...........Tariff. Free trade. Protectionism
3000-4055...........By region or country
5001-6182...........Business
5381-5386..........Vocational Guidance. Career development
5387-5387.5........Business ethics
5410-5417.5........Marketing. Distribution of products
5419-5422.......... Wholesale trade
5428-5429.6........ Retail trade
5429.7-5430.6......Shopping centers. Shopping malls
5437-5444..........Purchasing. Selling. Sales personnel. Sales executives
5446-5459..........Canvassing. Peddling
5460-5469.5........Department stores. Mail order business. Supermarkets. Convenience stores
5469.7-5481........Markets. Fairs
5482-5482.4........Secondhand trade
5482.6-5482.65.....Black market
5484-5495..........Warehouses. Storage
5520-5541..........Office equipment and supplies
5546-5548.6........Office management
5548.7-5548.85.....Industrial psychology
5549-5549.5........Personnel management. Employment management
5601-5689..........Accounting. Bookkeeping
5691-5716..........Business mathematics. Commercial arithmetic (Including tables, etc.)
5717-5734.7........Business communication (Including business report writing, business correspondence)
5735-5746..........Business records management
5761-5780..........Shipment of goods. Delivery of goods
5801-6182..........Advertising

HG - Finance 

1-9999...............Finance
178.................Liquidity
179.................Personal finance
201-1496............Money
258-312............Precious metals.  Bullion
315................Small coins
321-329............Mints.  Assaying
335-339............Counterfeiting
348-353.5..........Paper money
361-363............Legal tender
381-395............International coinage
401-421............Bimetallism
451-1496...........By region or country
1501-3550...........Banking
1621-1638..........Interest rates.  Interest tables
1641-1643..........Bank loans.  Bank credit.  Commercial loans
1651-1654..........Discount
1655...............Acceptances
1656...............Bank reserves.  Bank liquidity.  Loan loss reserves
1660...............Bank accounts.  Bank deposits.  Deposit banking
1662...............Insurance of deposits.  Deposit insurance
1685-1704..........Drafts.  Checks
1706-1708..........Accounting.  Bookkeeping
1709...............Data processing
1710-1710.5........Electronic funds transfers
1722...............Bank mergers
1723...............Bank stocks.  Banking as an investment
1725-1778..........Banks and the state.  State supervision of banks
1811-2351..........Special classes of banks and financial institutions
2397-3550..........By region or country
3691-3769...........Credit. Debt. Loans (Including credit institutions, credit instruments, consumer credit, bankruptcy)
3810-4000...........Foreign exchange.  International finance. International monetary system
4001-4285...........Finance management.  Business finance. Corporation finance
4301-4480.9.........Trust services.  Trust companies
4501-6051...........Investment, capital formation, speculation
4530...............Investment companies.  Investment trusts. Mutual funds
4538...............Foreign investments
4551-4598..........Stock exchanges
4621...............Stockbrokers.  Security dealers.  Investment advisers
4701-4751..........Government securities.  Industrial securities. Venture capital
4900-5993..........By region or country
6001-6051..........Speculation
6105-6270.9.........Lotteries
8011-9999...........Insurance
8053.5-8054.45.....Insurance for professions.  Malpractice insurance.  Professional liability insurance
8059...............Business insurance
8075-8107..........Insurance business.  Insurance management
8111-8123..........Government policy.  State supervision
8205-8220..........Government insurance
8501-8745..........By region or country
8751-9295..........Life insurance
8779-8793..........Actuarial science.  Statistical theory and methodology applied to insurance
8799-8830..........By class insured, by risk, by plan
8835-8899..........Life insurance business.  Management
8901-8914..........Government policy.  State supervision
8941-9200.5........By region or country
9201-9245..........Mutual life insurance.  Assessment life insurance.  Fraternal life insurance
9251-9262..........Industrial life insurance
9271...............Child insurance.  Life insurance for children
9291-9295..........Maternity insurance
9301-9343..........Accident insurance
9371-9399..........Health insurance
9651-9899..........Fire insurance
9956-9969..........Casualty insurance
9969.5-9999........Other insurance (Including automobile, burglary, credit, disaster, title )

HJ - Public finance 

9-9940..............Public finance
9-99.8	............Periodicals.  Serials.  By region or country
210-240............History
241-1620...........By region or country
2005-2216..........Income and expenditure.  Budget
2240-5908..........Revenue.  Taxation.  Internal revenue
2321-2323..........Tax incidence.  Tax shifting.  Tax equity
2326-2327..........Progressive taxation
2336-2337..........Tax exemption
2338...............Taxation of government property
2351...............Inflation and taxation
2351.4.............Tax revenue estimating
2361-3192.7........By region or country
3801-3844..........Revenue from sources other than taxation
3863-3925..........Direct taxation
4113-4601..........Property tax
4629-4830..........Income tax
4919-4936..........Capitation.  Poll tax
5309-5510..........Administrative fees.  User charges. License fees
6603-7390.......... Customs administration
7461-7980..........Expenditures.  Government spending
8001-8899..........Public debts
8052..............Sinking funds.  Amortization
8101-8899.........By region or country
9103-9695..........Local finance.  Municipal finance.
9701-9940..........Public accounting.  Auditing

HM - Sociology (General) 

1-1281............Sociology
1-299............These numbers are obsolete and no longer used by the Library of Congress
435-477..........History of sociology. History of sociological theory
461-473.........Schools of sociology. Schools of social thought
481-554..........Theory. Method. Relations to other subjects
621-656..........Culture
661-696..........Social control
701..............Social systems
706..............Social structure
711-806..........Groups and organizations
756-781.........Community
786-806.........Organizational sociology. Organization theory
811-821..........Deviant behavior. Social deviance
826..............Social institutions
831-901..........Social change
1001-1281........Social psychology
1041-1101.......Social perception. Social cognition
1106-1171.......Interpersonal relations. Social behavior
1176-1281.......Social influence. Social pressure

HN - Social history and conditions; Social problems; Social reform 

1-995.........Social history and conditions. Social problems. Social reform
30-39........The church and social problems
41-46........Community centers. Social centers
50-995.......By region or country

HQ - The family; Marriage; Woman; Sexuality 

1-2044...............The Family. Marriage. Women
12-449..............Sexual life
19-30.7............Sexual behavior and attitudes. Sexuality
31-64..............Sex instruction and sexual ethics
71-72..............Sexual deviations
74-74.2............Bisexuality
75-76.8............Homosexuality. Lesbianism
77-77.2............Transvestism
77.7-77.95.........Transsexualism
79.................Sadism. Masochism. Fetishism, etc.
101-440.7..........Prostitution
447................Masturbation
449................Emasculation. Eunuchs, etc.
450-472.............Erotica
503-1064............The family. Marriage. Home
750-755.5..........Eugenics
755.7-759.92.......Parents. Parenthood
760-767.7..........Family size
767.8-792.2........Children. Child development
793-799.2..........Youth. Adolescents. Teenagers
799.5-799.9........Young men and women
799.95-799.97......Adulthood
800-800.4..........Single people
801-801.83.........Man-woman relationships. Courtship. Dating
802................Matrimonial bureaus. Marriage brokerage
802.5..............Matrimonial advertisements
803................Temporary marriage. Trial marriage. Companionate marriage
804................Breach of promise
805................Desertion
806................Adultery
811-960.7..........Divorce
961-967............Free love
981-996............Polygamy
997................Polyandry
998-999............Illegitimacy. Unmarried mothers
1001-1006..........The state and marriage
1051-1057..........The church and marriage
1058-1058.5........Widows and widowers. Widowhood
1060-1064..........Aged. Gerontology (Social aspects). Retirement
1073-1073.5.........Thanatology. Death. Dying
1075-1075.5.........Sex role
1088-1090.7.........Men
1101-2030.7.........Women. Feminism
1871-2030.7........Women's clubs
2035-2039...........Life skills. Coping skills. Everyday living skills
2042-2044...........Life style

HS - Societies: secret, benevolent, etc. 

1-3371............Societies: secret, benevolent, etc.
101-330.7........Secret societies
351-929..........Freemasons
951-1179.........Odd Fellows
1201-1350........Knights of Pythias
1355.............Other societies
1501-2460.7......Other societies. By classes
1501-1510.......Benevolent and "friendly" societies and mutual assessment fraternities
1525-1560.......Religious societies
1601-2265.......Race societies
2275............Occupation societies
2301-2460.7.....Political and "patriotic" societies
2501-3371........Clubs. Clubs and societies for special classes (Including boys' societies, Boy scouts, girls' societies)

HT - Communities; Classes; Races 

51-1595............Communities. Classes. Races
51-65.............Human settlements. Communities
101-395...........Urban groups. The city. Urban sociology
161-165..........Garden cities. "The city beautiful"
165.5-169.9......City planning
170-178..........Urban renewal. Urban redevelopment
201-221..........City population (Including children in cities, immigration)
231..............Effect of city life
251-265..........Mental and moral life
281..............Recreation. Amusements
321-325..........The city as an economic factor. City promotion
330-334..........Metropolitan areas
351-352..........Suburban cities and towns
361-384..........Urbanization. City and country
388..............Regional economics. Space in economics
390-395..........Regional planning
401-485...........Rural groups. Rural sociology
601-1445..........Classes
621-635..........Origin of social classes
641-657..........Classes arising from birth (Including royalty, nobility, commons)
675-690..........Classes arising from occupation
713-725..........Caste system
731..............Freedmen
751-815..........Serfdom
851-1445.........Slavery
1501-1595.........Races (Including race as a social group and race relations in general)

HV - Social pathology; Social and public welfare; Criminology 

1-9960................Social pathology. Social and public welfare. Criminology
40-69................Social service. Social work. Charity organization and practice
85-525...............By region or country
530..................The church and charity
541..................Women and charity
544..................Charity fairs, bazaars, etc.
544.5................International social work
547..................Self-help groups
551.2-639............Emergency management
553-639.............Relief in case of disasters
560-583............Red Cross. Red Crescent
599-639............Special types of disasters
640-645..............Refugee problems
650-670..............Life saving
675-677..............Accidents. Prevention of accidents
680-696..............Free professional services. Including medical charities
697-4959.............Protection, assistance and relief
697-3024............Special classes
697-700.7..........Families. Mothers. Widow's -pensions
701-1420.5.........Children
835-847...........Foundlings
873-887...........Destitute, neglected, and abandoned children. Street children
888-907...........Children with disabilities
931-941...........Fresh-air funds
959-1420.5........Orphanages. Orphans
1421-1441..........Young adults. Youth. Teenagers
1442-1448..........Women
1449...............Gay men. Lesbians
1450-1494..........Aged
1551-3024..........People with disabilities, Including blind, deaf, people with physical and mental disabilities
3025-3174...........Special classes. By occupation
3025-3163..........Mariners
3165-3173..........Shop women, clerks, etc.
3174...............Other. By occupation
3176-3199...........Special classes. By race or ethnic group
4005-4013...........Immigrants
4023-4470.7.........Poor in cities. Slums
4480-4630...........Mendicancy. Vagabondism. Tramps. Homelessness
4701-4890.9.........Protection of animals. Animal rights. Animal welfare
4905-4959...........Animal experimentation. Anti-vivisection
4961-4995............Degeneration
5001-5720.5..........Alcoholism. Intemperance. Temperance reform
5725-5770............Tobacco habit
5800-5840............Drug habits. Drug abuse
6001-7220.5..........Criminology
6035-6197............Criminal anthropology (Including criminal types, criminal psychology, prison psychology, causes of crime)
6201-6249............Criminal classes
6250-6250.4..........Victims of crimes. Victimology
6251-6773.55.........Crimes and offenses
6774-7220.5..........Crimes and criminal classes
7231-9960............Criminal justice administration
7428................Social work with delinquents and criminals
7431................Prevention of crime, methods, etc.
7435-7439...........Gun control
7551-8280.7.........Police. Detectives. Constabulary
7935-8025..........Administration and organization
8031-8080..........Police duty. Methods of protection
8035-8069.........Special classes of crimes, offenses and criminals
8073-8079.35......Investigation of crimes. Examination and identification of prisoners
8079.2-8079.35....Police social work
8079.5-8079.55....Traffic control. Traffic accident investigation
8081-8099..........Private detectives. Detective bureaus
8130-8280.7........By region or country
8290-8291...........Private security services
8301-9920.7.........Penology. Prisons. Corrections
9051-9230.7........The juvenile offender. Juvenile delinquency. Reform schools, etc.
9261-9430.7........Reformation and reclamation of adult prisoners
9441-9920.7........By region or country
9950-9960...........By region or country

HX - Socialism; Communism; Anarchism 

1-970.9............Socialism. Communism. Anarchism
519-550...........Communism/socialism in relation to special topics
626-696...........Communism: Utopian socialism, collective settlements
806-811...........Utopias. The ideal state
821-970.9.........Anarchism

References

Further reading 
 Full schedule of all LCC Classifications
 List of all LCC Classification Outlines

H